Serge Jentgen (born 28 January 1962) is a retired Luxembourgian football midfielder.

References

1962 births
Living people
Luxembourgian footballers
FC Avenir Beggen players
CS Pétange players
Association football midfielders
Luxembourg international footballers